Robert Andrew Veale (born October 28, 1935) is an American former professional baseball player and coach. He played in Major League Baseball as a left-handed pitcher from  through  for the Pittsburgh Pirates and Boston Red Sox. Veale was one of the top strikeout pitchers in the National League during his tenure with the Pirates. Veale also played for the Boston Red Sox from 1972 to 1974.

Early life
Veale was born in Birmingham, Alabama, where he attended Holy Family High School in the Ensley neighborhood. His father had played baseball as a pitcher for the Homestead Grays of the Negro National League. As a boy, Veale worked the concession stand at Rickwood Field in Birmingham. The Birmingham Black Barons player-manager Piper Davis made him the team's batboy and let him pitch batting practice regularly. In 1948, Davis allowed the underaged Veale to pitch in a Black Barons game however, because he was a minor, his appearance was kept off the records. Veale left Birmingham in 1955 to attend Benedictine College in Atchison, Kansas, on an athletic scholarship.

Minor league career
In 1958, Veale was signed by the Pittsburgh Pirates as an amateur free agent. In 1959, he led the Carolina League with 187 strikeouts in 147 innings and pitched a no-hitter for the Wilson Tobs. His performance earned him a promotion to the Columbus Jets of the International League where, he established himself as a strikeout pitcher in 1961 by striking out a league-leading 208 batters in 201 innings.

Veale made his major league debut with the Pirates on April 16, 1962 at the age of 26. He had one complete game victory in only his second major league game but then, struggled and was sent back to the Columbus Jets on May 25. On August 10 he set an International League record for the most strikeouts in a game with 22 against the Buffalo Bisons. On September 3, he pitched a one-hitter against Jacksonville and struck out 15 batters. After striking out 179 batters in 134 innings and winning eight games, Veale was called back by the Pirates in September.

Major league career
Pirates manager Danny Murtaugh made Veale a starting pitcher in August 1963 and he responded impressively in September by throwing three complete games in six starts, including two shutouts. On September 22, 1964, Veale struck out 15 Milwaukee Braves to set the Pirates team record for most strikeouts in a nine-inning game, breaking the previous record of 12 set by Babe Adams in 1909. He led the National League with 250 strikeouts in 1964; he had been tied with Bob Gibson with 245 entering the final day of the season. He ended the season with a career-high record of 18-12 and a 2.74 earned run average.

Veale's emergence as one of the top strikeout pitchers in the league helped earn him a spot on the National League team in the 1965 All-Star Game. He struck out 16 batters on June 1 against the Philadelphia Phillies to break his own team record. In 1965, he improved his personal best with a career-high 276 strikeouts but, finished a distant second to Sandy Koufax's then-Major League record 382 strikeouts. He ended the season with a 17-12 win–loss record and a 2.84 earned run average to help the Pirates improve to a third place finish in the National League. His 276 strikeouts in a season remains a Pirates modern-era team record.

Veale was an integral member of the Pirates pitching staff during the 1966 season posting a 16-12 record and a 3.02 earned run average in 37 starts and was named to the National League team for the 1966 All-Star Game. The 1966 Pirates team which, included future Baseball Hall of Fame members Roberto Clemente, Bill Mazeroski and Willie Stargell as well as the National League batting champion Matty Alou, fought the Los Angeles Dodgers and San Francisco Giants in a tight pennant race and were in first place on September 10, before they faltered to finish the season in third place for a second consecutive year. Veale began the 1967 season by winning his first six starts and seven of his first eight starts. He ended the season with 16 victories against 8 losses but, his earned run average rose to 3.64.

An elbow injury in 1968 forced him to alter his pitching motion and reduced his strikeout rates. Veale had a losing record of 13-14 but, had an impressive 2.05 ERA, the lowest ERA since  by a pitcher with more than 20 starts and a losing record. In 1969 Veale had his last 200-plus strikeout season but, in 1970 his ERA rose to 3.92. Veale had maintained a 200-plus inning workload for seven consecutive seasons between 1964 and 1970. There were rumors that he might be traded prior to the 1971 season but instead, Murtaugh moved him to the bullpen.

The 1971 season turned to be one of the most successful in team history as the Pirates won the National League Eastern Division. Veale had a 6-0 win–loss record in 37 appearances out the bullpen. Although his earned run average was a very high 6.99, he pitched strongly in September as the Pirates made their push for the division title. On September 1, 1971, the Pirates became the first major league team to start a lineup of all minorities. Veale entered the game in the third inning in relief of starter Dock Ellis. The Pirates then defeated the San Francisco Giants three games to one in the 1971 National League Championship Series to face the Baltimore Orioles in the 1971 World Series. In the only postseason appearance of his career, he faced five batters, allowing two inherited runners to score on two walks and one hit as the Orioles won 11-3 in Game 2. The Pirates would go on to win the World Series in seven games.

On May 10, 1972 the Pirates released Veale and he agreed to accept an assignment to the Pirates' Triple-A team in Charleston. On September 1, the Boston Red Sox signed Veale and used him as a relief pitcher. He played in his final major league game on September 8, 1974 at the age of 38.

Career statistics
In a thirteen-season major league career, Veale posted a 120-95 record with 1,703 strikeouts and a 3.07 ERA in 1,926 innings pitched, including 20 shutouts and 78 complete games. His lifetime ratio of 7.96 strikeouts per nine innings is still a Pirates career team record and,
ranks fifth all-time for pitchers with 1,500-plus innings and, 65th overall on the MLB All-Time List. His 16 strikeouts in a game remains a Pirates team record. When he retired in 1974, he was the only Pirate pitcher to have 200 strikeouts in a season. Veale ranks second to Bob Friend in Pirates career strikeouts. He was among the top three strikeout pitchers in the National League three times and, he led the league in walks four times, tying a modern record.

Later life
After his playing career, Veale worked as a minor-league pitching instructor for the Atlanta Braves and the New York Yankees.

In 2006, Veale was inducted into the Alabama Sports Hall of Fame.

See also
 List of Major League Baseball annual strikeout leaders

References

External links

Audio Clip of Bob Veale discussing Jackie Robinson

1935 births
Living people
Major League Baseball pitchers
Pittsburgh Pirates players
Boston Red Sox players
National League All-Stars
Baseball players from Birmingham, Alabama
Benedictine Ravens baseball players
Benedictine Ravens men's basketball players
African-American baseball players
National League strikeout champions
Las Vegas Wranglers (baseball) players
Wilson Tobs players
Columbus Jets players
Charleston Charlies players
Pawtucket Red Sox players
21st-century African-American people
20th-century African-American sportspeople